Eastwood Hanley Football Club is a football club based in Hanley, Stoke-on-Trent, Staffordshire, England.

History

Original club
Situated in the Joiners Square area of the city (south east of the main town Hanley), Eastwood played their home games at the Trentmill Road ground for the majority of their history. The club was established in 1946. In 1987, they joined the Northern Premier League Division One in its first season, and at their height were one of the best non-league teams in North Staffordshire rivalling Leek Town for the top position in the pyramid. Their one major honour came in 1986 when they won the Staffordshire Senior Cup.

They were forced out of their Trentmill Road home in the early 1990s due to regular vandalism of the site and although they groundshared with Kidsgrove and Newcastle for a few seasons, interest in the club waned and gates decreased. The club eventually folded in 1997.

Modern club
After a failed bid to revive the club in 2009, the club was re-established in 2014 when Sandford Hill Allstars adopted the name. They subsequently joined the Staffordshire County Senior League. Currently playing their home games at Eastwood Hanley stadium. The club now have a Development side that ply their trade in Division 2 of the Staffs County League also at Northwood Stadium.

Honours
North West Counties League Division Two
Runners-up 1983–84
Mid-Cheshire League
Runners-up 1966–67
Staffordshire Senior Cup
Winners 1985-86
Staffs County League Division Two
Champions 2015–16

Records
FA Cup
Third Qualifying Round 1972–73, 1991–92, 1994–95
FA Trophy
First Qualifying Round 1973–74, 1976–77, 1977–78
FA Vase
Fifth Round 1988–89

References

Football clubs in England
Association football clubs established in 1946
Association football clubs disestablished in 1997
Sport in Stoke-on-Trent
North West Counties Football League clubs
1946 establishments in England
1997 disestablishments in England
2014 establishments in England
Association football clubs established in 2014
Midland Football League (1994)
Staffordshire County Senior League
West Midlands (Regional) League
Cheshire County League clubs